This is a list of broadcast television stations licensed to, or located in cities in the U.S. state of New Jersey.

Note: The state of New Jersey lies predominantly within the television markets of New York and Philadelphia.

Full-power stations licensed to cities in New Jersey
VC refers to the station's PSIP virtual channel. RF refers to the station's physical RF channel.

Non-operational (legacy) full-power stations
Channel 13: WNTA-TV - Ind. - Newark/New York (5/15/1948-12/22/1961)
Channel 46: WFPG-TV - NBC/CBS/ABC/DuMont - Atlantic City (12/21/1952-5/17/1954)
Channel 48: WKBS-TV - Ind. - Burlington/Philadelphia (9/1/1965-8/29/1983)
Channel 58: WRTV - Asbury Park (12/14/1953-4/1/1955)
Channel 66: WNYJ-TV - ETV - West Milford/New York (3/1/1996-10/25/2017)

LPTV stations

Translators

See also
The Comcast Network
NBC Sports Philadelphia
MSG (TV channel)
MSG Plus
SportsNet New York
YES Network
 List of Spanish-language television networks in the United States

References

New Jersey
Television stations
Mass media in New Jersey